Replay: The Moment (lit. Replay: The Moment It Starts Again) is a South Korean web series starring Kim Min-chul, Cho Mi-yeon, Kim Hwi-young, Choi Ji-su and Marco. The episodes aired on Replay's YouTube official channel and various OTT platforms (wavve, Seezn, U+mobile TV, etc.) every Tuesday and Friday at 19:00 (KST).

Synopsis
The drama depicts an empathetic romance in a clumsy and anxious, but dreams and love of reliving past emotions in the present eighteen youth. It is unfolded in a way that reproduces the past from the present.

Cast

Main
 Kim Min-chul as Gong Chan-young, Neon Paprika's keyboardist.
 Cho Mi-yeon as Yoo Ha-young, Neon Paprika's vocalist.
 Kim Hwi-young as Lee Ji-hoon, Neon Paprika's guitarist.
 Choi Ji-su as Im Seo-eun, Neon Paprika's leader and bassist.
 Marco as Shim Tae-young, Neon Paprika's drummer.

Special appearance
 Kwon Hyuk-soo as Lee In-ho
 Lee Do-yeon as the homeroom teacher (episode 1)
 Jeong Hyeon-hwan as the workshop owner (episodes 5 and 6)
 Lee Gyu-ho as Im Seo-eun's uncle (episode 4)
 Jiwon (episode 10)

Production

Development
The drama is produced by Heart People who had produced  web drama, Our Baseball.

Casting
On September 24, 2020, Heart People announced that they had confirmed the main casting of the web drama 'Replay' and has started shooting. It was reported that Cho Mi-yeon and Kim Hwi-young has been cast in the series. The following day, Cho Mi-yeon and Choi Ji-su confirmed joining the cast. The first script reading was held in September 2020.

Promotion
On October 19, 2020, the stills from filming of the series were released. A teaser poster with the phrase 'Neon Paprika' and tagline "The moment when everything starts again" was released on December 4, 2020. From December 18–25, 2020, introductions of the characters were released.

On January 4, 2021, a band version poster was released through the drama's social media accounts. In the released poster, the five protagonists pose with their own musical instruments. The production company Heart People stated, "The actors learned the instruments themselves and played them throughout the filming period for real acting."

Release
A pre-release video of 'Replay Space Tour was released on January 8, 2021. On January 10, the main trailer for the web drama was released and announcing the series premiere date on January 19. Heart People held a live online fan showcase through Like That's official YouTube channel at 5 pm KST the same day of its released.

On July 22, 2021, South Korean media company NEW K.ID announced that Replay will aired on The Roku Channel, LG Channels, Samsung TV Plus, Xumo, Vizio, Plex, Whale Live, and THETA.tv in North America, South America, and Europe.

Broadcast

Original soundtrack

Part 1

Part 2

Part 3

Part 4

Part 5

Part 6

Part 7

Special track

Replay: Original Television Soundtrack
The following is the official track list of Replay: Original Television Soundtrack album. The tracks with no indicated lyricists and composers are the drama's musical score; the artists indicated for these tracks are the tracks' composers themselves. Singles included on the album were released from January 28 to February 26, 2021.

Episodes

Reception

Viewership
The web series accumulated two million views in 10 days after the released and entered the top ranking popular Korean YouTube videos and popular web dramas on various portal sites. At the end of February, the series recorded more than 6 million cumulative views and 380,000 hours of viewing time, also the buzzword "Hey! Gong Chan-young" was a hot topic from real-time comments from global fans.

Awards and nominations

Notes

References

External links
 
 Replay on Viki

South Korean drama web series
2021 web series debuts
2021 web series endings